Azonto is a West African music genre and dance. 

Azonto may also refer to:
"Azonto" (Fuse ODG song), 2013
"Azonto" (Wizkid song), 2012